Pagoh is a suburb in Muar District, Johor, Malaysia. Pagoh is accessible via one of the main interchanges on the North–South Expressway, the major expressway on the west coast of Peninsular Malaysia. There are several federal government institutions in that town, including Institut Kemahiran Belia Negara (IKBN) and Malaysian National Service Nasuha Camp.

History 
During the Malayan Emergency, British and Commonwealth forces publicly displayed the corpses of pro-independence guerrillas in Pagoh.

Education 
Primary education is provided by several primary schools in Pagoh. One example is SJKC (national type Chinese school) Soon Mong which is approximately 50 years old. One of the secondary schools in Pagoh is SMK Sultan Alauddin Riayat Shah I (SARS1), named after the sultan of Malacca who died in Pagoh.

Pagoh Educational Hub (EduHub Pagoh), the largest public higher education hub area in Malaysia, is being constructed at Bandar Universiti Pagoh, a new well-planned education township in Muar. The first phase has been launched in the middle of September 2011.

Tourist attractions
 Damai Orchard (Dusun Damai)
 Kampung Raja Mosque and Sultan Alauddin Riayat Shah I's tomb
 Nasuha Spice Garden (Taman Rempah Ratus Nasuha)

Sports and recreation
 Pagoh National Sports Council Complex

See also

 Bandar Universiti Pagoh
 Muar (town)

References

Towns in Johor
Towns, suburbs and villages in Muar